An ovary is a reproductive organ in female vertebrate.

Ovary may also refer to:
 Ovary (botany), reproductive organ in plants
 Leopold Óváry, Hungarian historian

See also
 Overy (disambiguation)